The third season of the television series HaShminiya was originally broadcast on Arutz HaYeladim (HOT) in Israel.

Season overview
The third season starts in Mika's aunt's villa. It's summer holiday. When a weird guest is coming to the villa, everybody in the octette, except Aya, joins the police's secret organization "HaMoatza". Aya prefers to spend her summer holidays helping pregnant Dganit and reading books. The octette introduce themselves to Alex, Lillie's sister and the head of "HaMoatza", and the three procurators, Yoel, Dafi, the weird guest, and Omri. At the same time, Avi, who becomes the Shminiya commander, breaks up with Mika and moves into Czechov's place, a member of "HaMoatza" too, and an old friend. Avi doesn't know that he was chosen to be commander because of his relationship with Czechov. Roni and Nini are coming back together, Nitzan and Adam keep on their relationship, although Adam still has feelings for Aya.

At the same time Dganit's doctor, Yulius Calderon, arouses suspicion in Aya, and later it is exposed that he was the doctor of all the octette members' mothers, when they were pregnant. Yulius combines Daniel Harris and Lina, who escaped jail, and together they are trying to get the Crypton gene, the gene that makes a human with lambda ripples, a physically perfect human.

Episodes

{| class="wikitable plainrowheaders" style="width:100%; margin:auto; background:#FFFFFF;"
|-
! style="background-color: #FFA500; color:#000; text-align: center;" width="35"|Series# 
!! style="background-color: #FFA500; color:#000; text-align: center;" width="35"|Season# 
!! style="background-color: #FFA500; color:#000; text-align: center;"|Title
!! style="background-color: #FFA500; color:#000; text-align: center;" width="140"|Original airdate
|-
!colspan="4;" style="background-color: #FFA500; color: #000"| Part 1

!colspan="4;" style="background-color: #FFA500; color: #000"| Part 2

|}

2006 Israeli television seasons
2007 Israeli television seasons
Split television seasons